Józef Kościelski (9 November 1845, Służewo - 22 June 1911, Poznań) was a Polish poet, politician and parliamentarian, co-founder of the Straż (Guard) society.

References 
 Witold Jakóbczyk, Przetrwać na Wartą 1815-1914, Dzieje narodu i państwa polskiego, vol. III-55, Krajowa Agencja Wydawnicza, Warszawa 1989

1845 births
1911 deaths
People from Aleksandrów County
People from the Grand Duchy of Posen
19th-century Polish nobility
Polish Party politicians
Members of the 6th Reichstag of the German Empire
Members of the 7th Reichstag of the German Empire
Members of the 8th Reichstag of the German Empire
Members of the 9th Reichstag of the German Empire
Members of the Prussian House of Lords
Polish poets
Polish deputies to the Reichstag in Berlin